Quantum3D is an American computer graphics company. It was founded on 31 March 1997 as a spin-off from 3dfx that was created to bring 3dfx's scalable graphics technologies (the Voodoo family of graphics chips) to the game enthusiast, coin-op/arcade/LBE and visual simulation and training market. Despite its close relationship with 3dfx in its earlier years, it was founded as an independent, venture-backed company.

Founded by 3dfx, Gemini Technology and SGI co-founders, along with former Intel and Sun Microsystems employees including Ross Q. Smith, John Archdeacon, Charles "Herb" Kuta, Dan Downum, Phil Huelson, and Dale Stimson, the company has developed a range of 3dfx and now NVIDIA-based board level and system level products for advanced, realtime 3D graphics and video intensive applications.  Quantum3D was instrumental in bringing advanced graphics products to the PC-game enthusiast market (first SLI graphics boards) and for bringing PC-based, open architecture systems to both the  coin-op/arcade/LBE market (Graphite ArcadePC) and to the visual and sensor simulation and training (VSST) market (AAlchemy PC-IG) for both military and commercial applications. In addition, Quantum3D has also been a pioneer in bringing commercial off-the-shelf (COTS) graphics subsystems into the embedded visual computing (EVC) market for avionics, vetronics and command and control applications.

Concurrent with the sale of 3dfx assets to NVIDIA in 2000, Quantum3D switched to NVIDIA as its primary graphics technology supplier.  Since that date, Quantum3D has introduced a number of VSST and EVC products including the AAlchemy and Independence family of COTS image generators for flight simulation and other training applications as well as the Sentiris PCI Mezzanine Card (PMC), ExpeditionDI dismounted infantry training system, Thermite tactical visual computer and Farsight programs that have resulted in COTS technology being placed in numerous commercial and military avionics and vetronics applications. The company also has a dedicated US Federal subsidiary, CG2, which provides visual computing related services and products to the United States Department of Defense via SBIR and BAA programs.

The company is privately held and had approximately 50 employees as of August 2020.

References

External links
 Quantum3D website

Companies established in 1997
Computer companies of the United States
Electronics companies of the United States
Software companies based in California
Graphics hardware companies
Companies based in San Jose, California
Nvidia
Software companies of the United States